Cantua is a genus of flowering plants in the family Polemoniaceae which is in the order Ericales. 
They are restricted to central South America where many species are endemics in the countries of occurrence.

There are currently about 12 recognised species including:

Cantua bicolor Lem., native to Bolivia and Peru
Cantua buxifolia Juss. ex Lam., native to Bolivia
Cantua candelilla Brand
Cantua cuzcoensis Infantes
Cantua dendritica J.M.Porter & Prather
Cantua flexuosa (Ruiz & Pav.) Pers.
Cantua mediamnis J.M.Porter & Prather
Cantua pyrifolia Juss. ex Lam.
Cantua quercifolia Juss.
Cantua volcanica J.M.Porter & Prather

Synonyms include:
 Huthia Brand
 Periphragmos Ruiz & Pav.
 Tunaria Kuntze

References

Polemoniaceae
Polemoniaceae genera